Conus antoniaensis is a species of sea snail, a marine gastropod mollusc in the family Conidae, the cone snails, cone shells or cones.

These snails are predatory and venomous. They are capable of "stinging" humans.

Description
The size of the shell varies between 11 mm and 30 mm.

Distribution
This species occurs in the Atlantic Ocean off Boa Vista Island, Cape Verde.

References

 Cossignani T. & Fiadeiro R. (2014). Quattro nuovi coni da Capo Verde. Malacologia Mostra Mondiale. 83: 14-19
 Cossignani T. & Fiadeiro R. (2018). Quattro nuovi coni da Capo Verde. Malacologia Mostra Mondiale. 98: 14-20.

External links
 To World Register of Marine Species
 Cone Shells - Knights of the Sea
 
 Manuel J. Tenorio, Samuel Abalde, José R. Pardos-Blas, Rafael Zardoya - Taxonomic revision of West African cone snails (Gastropoda: Conidae) based upon mitogenomic studies: implications for conservation; European Journal of Taxonomy 663: 1–89 (2020)

antoniaensis
Gastropods described in 2014
Gastropods of Cape Verde
Fauna of Boa Vista, Cape Verde